Goddess: How I fell in Love is a 2004 drama film, directorial debut of Renata Litvinova.

Plot
Police investigator Faina lives alone, because of work she always comes home very late. She often drowns her sorrows in alcohol because of her stressful and dangerous job. Faina does not have the time or energy for romantic relationships. She looks at everyone with the eyes of the investigator; in everyone she sees a criminal or a maniac.

Faina is investigating a mysterious disappearance of a girl. They are looking for the child for a year and the relatives have almost lost all hope. Faina continues to search, feeling that the girl is alive.

Cast
Renata Litvinova — Faina, investigator
Konstantin Murzenko — investigator Yegorov (Yagurov)
Maksim Sukhanov — Professor
Dmitry Ulyanov — Nikolay
Andrey Krasko — doctor Pavel
Elena Rufanova — doctor Elena
Svetlana Svetlichnaya — ghost mom
Viktor Sukhorukov — Victor Iliazarovich
Konstantin Khabensky — Polosoyev
Olga Blok-Mirimskaya — Aglaya
Polina Borisova — missing girl, daughter of Victor

References

External links

Russian drama films
2004 drama films
2004 directorial debut films
2004 films